Alfredo Jones Brown (Montevideo, 1876 - 1950) was a Uruguayan architect.

His father, Enrique Agustín Jones de Elía, was of British descent; and his mother, Natividad Brown Blanco, was a granddaughter of admiral William Brown.

He graduated as an architect at the University of the Republic.

Notable works
Edificio Rex
Instituto Alfredo Vásquez Acevedo
Escuela Alemania

Literature

References

1876 births
1950 deaths
People from Montevideo
Uruguayan people of British descent
Uruguayan people of Irish descent
University of the Republic (Uruguay) alumni
Uruguayan architects